Mahfuzul Huq was a Member of Parliament of Pakistan representing the eastern East Bengal.

Career 
Huq was elected to parliament from Chittagong, East Pakistan as a Muslim candidate in 1955.

References 

Pakistani MNAs 1955–1958

People from Chittagong District